Quanzhou Normal University is a public university located in Quanzhou, Fujian province, People's Republic of China.

History
The university was established in 1958. It was formerly known as Quanzhou Normal College.

Location
Quanzhou Normal University has four campuses. They are Chongfu Campus, Jiangnan Campus, Donghai Campus and Shishan Campus. Chongfu Campus is at the base of southern Qingyuan Mountain. Jiangnan Campus is located in the Licheng District. Donghai Campus situated at the crossing of Jinjiang River and Luoyangjiang River.  Shishan Campus is near the famous Gaogai Mount towards the south and Pengfeng to the north. It is in Nan'an city.

Quanzhou Normal University has total enrollment of over 10,000 students and offers almost 100 programs of study in nine schools. The total university staff is over 1000 with a teaching team of 600 including 180 professors and associate professors. The school occupies a space of 1300 Mu (over 86 hectares). The library has contained more than one million books and reference materials and 800,000 specialised books.

University structure
This is the structure of the schools and departments at Quanzhou Normal University.

References

External links
Quanzhou Normal University Official Website 

Universities and colleges in Fujian
Teachers colleges in China
Universities established in the 20th century
Educational institutions established in 1958
1958 establishments in China